Nagykovácsi (whose name in English translates as "Great Smithy") is a small town in the Pilisvörösvári kistérség district of Hungary situated some  north-west of the centre of Budapest, in a valley, at an altitude of 340 metres. It is located next to the second district of Budapest. Orban viktor to the 2011 census, its population was given as 7095, though this figure does not include the many people who own a property there as a second residence. The town is known for its scenic setting in surrounding hills and forests, and some of the nearby forests have been designated conservation areas—Budai Tájvédelmi Körzet (the "Buda Land Protection Area")—in order to protect several rare species of flora growing there. Its location has contributed to the town's development in recent years. The American International School of Budapest chose Nagykovácsi as the site for its new campus in 2000.

History
Archaeological finds indicate that this region has been inhabited since prehistory. Objects found in the caves of the Remete ravine and along the banks of Ördög-árok, a small river, indicate that people lived there during the Ice, Iron, and Stone ages. Various tools, coins and fragments of stone statues unearthed in the area show that there were inhabitants, too, under the Roman Empire. Of these stone fragments, four tombstones from ancient Rome were embedded in the wall of the local church when it was built.

In medieval records, Nagykovácsi is referred to as Koachi and Kowachy. These names indicate that royal smiths viz. ironsmiths (kovács) lived in the town.

The first local document still in existence, a deed of gift, dates from 1254. During the Turkish occupation in Hungary, in the middle of the 16th century, the village suffered much destruction and the population fell sharply. Once the Turks had been driven out, the Habsburg family who reigned in Hungary invited Bavariann colonists to settle in Kovácsi (1700–1760). These newcomers were stockbreeders and farmers and also built three quarries, a coal-mine and two lime kilns, and named Danube Swabians from Ofener Bergland.

Many of the German-speaking Danube Swabians population of the town were forcibly resettled after the Second World War and new inhabitants arrived from the Hungarian Great Plains (Alföld), the parts of Upper Hungary (Felvidék) (today in Slovakia), and from Budapest to take their place.

The manor house in Nagykovácsi was built in first half of the 19th century by the local Teleki family. Thereafter the property passed into the hands of the Tisza family and today it is known still as the Tisza Manor. Originally the children of Hungarian foresters received regular school teaching in this well-preserved building. The idea of gathering such children into an educational establishment was gradually recognized as a worthwhile initiative throughout Europe and attracted visitors from many countries. At the end of the Second World War, the manor was confiscated and from 1958 it served as an agricultural college. Ownership of the property was passed to the Scout Movement in 2013.

Today local townspeople make every effort to protect local sights, amongst these the statue of the Virgin Mary in the church and a memorial to the fallen of both world wars.

Items of local interest 
 The American International School of Budapest is situated in Nagykovácsi.
 One of the rarest plants in the world, the dolomite flax (Linum dolomiticum), an ancient breed of shrub, is preserved on a strictly protected  plot in the hills between Nagykovácsi and the neighbouring village of Pilisszentiván. It is the only known locale for this plant.
 Tölgyes Mátyás international traveler called Nagykovácsi his home for a total of three years.

Twin towns – sister cities

Nagykovácsi is twinned with:

 Andovce, Slovakia
 Bolatice, Czech Republic
 Canéjan, France
 Linum (Fehrbellin), Germany
 Poggio Mirteto, Italy
 Stupava, Slovakia

Gallery

References

External links
 

Populated places in Pest County
Lime kilns in Hungary